Donakonda is a town in the Prakasam district of the Indian state of Andhra Pradesh.

Geography 
It is located in Donakonda mandal in Kandukur revenue division. The terrain is mostly flat, but as surrounded by hills some distance away.

Transport 

Donakonda Railway Station is situated on the - railway line and falls under the Guntur division of South Central Railway. Donakonda Airport (ICAO: VODK) is located at Donakonda in Andhra Pradesh, India. The airfield was constructed during World War II by the British regime to refuel its aircraft. It is owned by the Airports Authority of India and is now closed. 

The Government of Andhra Pradesh handed over the Donakonda airport to Bhogapuram Airport Authority and an ongoing extension of the airport is being worked on.

Villages 

 Westkambhampadu
 Aravallipadu
 Chandavaram
 Gangadevapalli
 Mallampeta
 P.Lakshmipuram
 Rudrasamudram
 Pullayapalle
 KotcherlaKota
 Ramapuram
 Polepalli
 Yarrabalem
 Pedda Gudipadu
 Chinnagudipadu
 Bhumanapalle
 Narasimhanayuni Palem
 Illacheruvu
 Venkatapuram

References

External links

Villages in Guntur district